This is an incomplete list of elections in the Commonwealth of Massachusetts sorted both by offices sought and by years held.

Elections are administered by the individual municipalities. There is some oversight by the Secretary of the Commonwealth and the Office of Campaign and Political Finance.

Individual elections are listed with the winner.

General
 November 5, 1861
 November 4, 1862
 November 3, 1863
 November 8, 1864
 November 7, 1865
 November 6, 1866
 November 5, 1867
 November 3, 1868
 November 2, 1869
 November 8, 1870
 November 7, 1871
 November 5, 1872
 November 4, 1873
 November 3, 1874
 November 2, 1875
 November 7, 1876
 November 6, 1877
 November 5, 1878
 November 4, 1879
 November 2, 1880
 November 8, 1881
 November 7, 1882
 November 6, 1883
 November 4, 1884
 November 3, 1885
 November 2, 1886
 November 8, 1887
 November 6, 1888
 November 5, 1889
 November 4, 1890
 November 3, 1891
 November 8, 1892
 November 7, 1893
 November 6, 1894
 November 5, 1895
 November 3, 1896
 November 2, 1897
 November 8, 1898
 November 7, 1899
 November 6, 1900
 November 5, 1901
 November 4, 1902
 November 3, 1903
 November 8, 1904
 November 7, 1905
 November 6, 1906
 November 5, 1907
 November 3, 1908
 November 2, 1909
 November 8, 1910
 November 7, 1911
 November 5, 1912
 November 4, 1913
 November 3, 1914
 November 6, 1917
 1919 Massachusetts general election, November 4, 1919
 1920 Massachusetts general election, November 2, 1920
 1922 Massachusetts general election, November 7, 1922
 1924 Massachusetts general election, November 4, 1924
 1926 Massachusetts general election, November 2, 1926
 1928 Massachusetts general election, November 6, 1928
 1930 Massachusetts general election, November 4, 1930
 1932 Massachusetts general election, November 8, 1932
 1934 Massachusetts general election, November 6, 1934
 1936 Massachusetts general election, November 3, 1936
 1938 Massachusetts general election, November 8, 1938
 1940 Massachusetts general election, November 5, 1940
 1942 Massachusetts general election
 1944 Massachusetts general election
 1946 Massachusetts general election
 1948 Massachusetts general election
 1950 Massachusetts general election
 1952 Massachusetts general election
 1954 Massachusetts general election
 1956 Massachusetts general election
 1958 Massachusetts general election
 1960 Massachusetts general election
 1962 Massachusetts general election
 1964 Massachusetts general election
 1966 Massachusetts general election
 1970 Massachusetts general election
 1974 Massachusetts general election
 1978 Massachusetts general election
 1982 Massachusetts general election
 1986 Massachusetts general election
 1990 Massachusetts general election
 1994 Massachusetts general election
 1998 Massachusetts general election
 2000 Massachusetts general election
 2002 Massachusetts general election
 2004 Massachusetts general election
 2006 Massachusetts general election
 2008 Massachusetts general election
 2010 Massachusetts general election
 2012 Massachusetts general election
 2014 Massachusetts general election
 2016 Massachusetts general election
 2018 Massachusetts general election
 2020 Massachusetts general election
 2022 Massachusetts general election

By office

Governor
 …
 1839 Massachusetts gubernatorial election (Morton)
 1840 Massachusetts gubernatorial election (Davis)
 1841 Massachusetts gubernatorial election (Davis)
 1842 Massachusetts gubernatorial election (Morton)
 1843 Massachusetts gubernatorial election (Briggs)
 1844 Massachusetts gubernatorial election (Briggs)
 1845 Massachusetts gubernatorial election (Briggs)
 1846 Massachusetts gubernatorial election (Briggs)
 1847 Massachusetts gubernatorial election (Briggs)
 1848 Massachusetts gubernatorial election (Briggs)
 1849 Massachusetts gubernatorial election (Briggs)
 1850 Massachusetts gubernatorial election (Boutwell)
 1851 Massachusetts gubernatorial election (Boutwell)
 1852 Massachusetts gubernatorial election (Clifford)
 1853 Massachusetts gubernatorial election (E. Washburn)
 1854 Massachusetts gubernatorial election (Gardner)
 1855 Massachusetts gubernatorial election (Gardner)
 1856 Massachusetts gubernatorial election (Gardner)
 1857 Massachusetts gubernatorial election (Banks)
 1858 Massachusetts gubernatorial election (Banks)
 1859 Massachusetts gubernatorial election (Banks)
 1860 Massachusetts gubernatorial election (Andrew)
 1861 Massachusetts gubernatorial election (Andrew)
 1862 Massachusetts gubernatorial election (Andrew)
 1863 Massachusetts gubernatorial election (Andrew)
 1864 Massachusetts gubernatorial election (Andrew)
 1865 Massachusetts gubernatorial election (Bullock)
 1866 Massachusetts gubernatorial election (Bullock)
 1867 Massachusetts gubernatorial election (Bullock)
 1868 Massachusetts gubernatorial election (Claflin)
 1869 Massachusetts gubernatorial election (Claflin)
 1870 Massachusetts gubernatorial election (Claflin)
 1871 Massachusetts gubernatorial election (W. Washburn)
 1872 Massachusetts gubernatorial election (W. Washburn)
 1873 Massachusetts gubernatorial election (W. Washburn)
 1874 Massachusetts gubernatorial election (Gaston)
 1875 Massachusetts gubernatorial election (Rice)
 1876 Massachusetts gubernatorial election (Rice)
 1877 Massachusetts gubernatorial election (Rice)
 1878 Massachusetts gubernatorial election (Talbot)
 1879 Massachusetts gubernatorial election (Long)
 1880 Massachusetts gubernatorial election (Long)
 1881 Massachusetts gubernatorial election (Long)
 1882 Massachusetts gubernatorial election (Butler)
 1883 Massachusetts gubernatorial election (Robinson)
 1884 Massachusetts gubernatorial election (Robinson)
 1885 Massachusetts gubernatorial election (Robinson)
 1886 Massachusetts gubernatorial election (Ames)
 1887 Massachusetts gubernatorial election (Ames)
 1888 Massachusetts gubernatorial election (Ames)
 1889 Massachusetts gubernatorial election (Brackett)
 1890 Massachusetts gubernatorial election (Russell)
 1891 Massachusetts gubernatorial election (Russell)
 1892 Massachusetts gubernatorial election (Russell)
 1893 Massachusetts gubernatorial election (Greenhalge)
 1894 Massachusetts gubernatorial election (Greenhalge)
 1895 Massachusetts gubernatorial election (Greenhalge)
 1896 Massachusetts gubernatorial election (Wolcott)
 1897 Massachusetts gubernatorial election (Wolcott)
 1898 Massachusetts gubernatorial election (Wolcott)
 1899 Massachusetts gubernatorial election (Crane)
 1900 Massachusetts gubernatorial election (Crane)
 1901 Massachusetts gubernatorial election (Crane)
 1902 Massachusetts gubernatorial election (Bates)
 1903 Massachusetts gubernatorial election (Bates)
 1904 Massachusetts gubernatorial election (Douglas)
 1905 Massachusetts gubernatorial election (Guild)
 1906 Massachusetts gubernatorial election (Guild)
 1907 Massachusetts gubernatorial election (Guild)
 1908 Massachusetts gubernatorial election (Draper)
 1909 Massachusetts gubernatorial election (Draper)
 1910 Massachusetts gubernatorial election (Foss)
 1911 Massachusetts gubernatorial election (Foss)
 1912 Massachusetts gubernatorial election (Foss)
 1913 Massachusetts gubernatorial election (Walsh)
 1914 Massachusetts gubernatorial election (Walsh)
 1915 Massachusetts gubernatorial election (McCall)
 1916 Massachusetts gubernatorial election (McCall)
 1917 Massachusetts gubernatorial election (McCall)
 1918 Massachusetts gubernatorial election (Coolidge)
 1919 Massachusetts gubernatorial election (Coolidge)

Two-year terms, starting in 1920:
 1920 Massachusetts gubernatorial election (Cox)
 1922 Massachusetts gubernatorial election (Cox)
 1924 Massachusetts gubernatorial election (Fuller)
 1926 Massachusetts gubernatorial election (Fuller)
 1928 Massachusetts gubernatorial election (Allen)
 1930 Massachusetts gubernatorial election (Ely)
 1932 Massachusetts gubernatorial election (Ely)
 1934 Massachusetts gubernatorial election (Curley)
 1936 Massachusetts gubernatorial election (Hurley)
 1938 Massachusetts gubernatorial election (Saltonstall)
 1940 Massachusetts gubernatorial election (Saltonstall)
 1942 Massachusetts gubernatorial election (Saltonstall)
 1944 Massachusetts gubernatorial election (Tobin)
 1946 Massachusetts gubernatorial election (Bradford)
 1948 Massachusetts gubernatorial election (Dever)
 1950 Massachusetts gubernatorial election (Dever)
 1952 Massachusetts gubernatorial election (Herter)
 1954 Massachusetts gubernatorial election (Herter)
 1956 Massachusetts gubernatorial election (Furcolo)
 1958 Massachusetts gubernatorial election (Furcolo)
 1960 Massachusetts gubernatorial election (Volpe)
 1962 Massachusetts gubernatorial election (Peabody)
 1964 Massachusetts gubernatorial election (Volpe)

Four-year terms, starting in 1966:
 1966 Massachusetts gubernatorial election (Sargent)
 1970 Massachusetts gubernatorial election (Volpe)
 1974 Massachusetts gubernatorial election (Dukakis)
 1978 Massachusetts gubernatorial election (King)
 1982 Massachusetts gubernatorial election (Dukakis)
 1986 Massachusetts gubernatorial election (Dukakis)
 1990 Massachusetts gubernatorial election (Weld)
 1994 Massachusetts gubernatorial election (Weld)
 1998 Massachusetts gubernatorial election (Cellucci)
 2002 Massachusetts gubernatorial election (Romney)
 2006 Massachusetts gubernatorial election (Patrick)
 2010 Massachusetts gubernatorial election (Patrick)
 2014 Massachusetts gubernatorial election (Baker)
 2018 Massachusetts gubernatorial election (Baker)
 2022 Massachusetts gubernatorial election (Healey)

Massachusetts Senate

 …
 2002 Massachusetts Senate elections
 2004 Massachusetts Senate elections
 2006 Massachusetts Senate elections
 2008 Massachusetts Senate elections
 2010 Massachusetts Senate elections
 2012 Massachusetts Senate elections
 2014 Massachusetts Senate elections
 2016 Massachusetts Senate elections
 2018 Massachusetts Senate elections
 2020 Massachusetts Senate elections

Massachusetts House of Representatives

 …
 2002 Massachusetts House of Representatives elections
 2004 Massachusetts House of Representatives elections
 2006 Massachusetts House of Representatives elections
 2008 Massachusetts House of Representatives elections
 2010 Massachusetts House of Representatives elections
 2012 Massachusetts House of Representatives elections
 2014 Massachusetts House of Representatives elections
 2016 Massachusetts House of Representatives elections
 2018 Massachusetts House of Representatives elections
 2020 Massachusetts House of Representatives elections

Governor's Council
 …
 2002 Massachusetts Governor's Council elections
 2004 Massachusetts Governor's Council elections
 2006 Massachusetts Governor's Council elections
 2008 Massachusetts Governor's Council elections
 2010 Massachusetts Governor's Council elections
 2012 Massachusetts Governor's Council elections
 2014 Massachusetts Governor's Council elections
 2016 Massachusetts Governor's Council elections
 2018 Massachusetts Governor's Council elections
 2020 Massachusetts Governor's Council elections

Ballot questions 
General source: 
 Massachusetts ballot measures, 1980:
 1.  Prohibit discrimination against handicapped persons
 2.  Proposition 2½
 3.  Limiting state and local taxes; increase state share of education costs
 4.  Increase salaries of certain state officials
 5.  Restrict state authority to place certain costs on cities and towns
 6.  Change legislative voting procedure for emergency laws
 Massachusetts ballot measures, 2002:
 1.  Eliminating State Personal Income Tax
 2.  Massachusetts English Language Education in Public Schools Initiative
 3.  Taxpayer Funding for Political Campaigns
 Massachusetts ballot measures, 2004:
 none
 Massachusetts ballot measures, 2006:
 1.  Sale of Wine by Food Stores
 2.  Nomination of Candidates for Public Office
 3.  Family Child Care Providers
 Massachusetts ballot measures, 2008:
 1.  Massachusetts State Income Tax Repeal
 2.  Massachusetts Sensible Marijuana Policy
 3.  Massachusetts Greyhound Protection Act
 Massachusetts ballot measures, 2010:
 1.  Massachusetts No Sales Tax for Alcohol Initiative
 2.  Massachusetts Comprehensive Permits and Regional Planning Initiative
 3.  Massachusetts Sales Tax Relief Act
 Massachusetts ballot measures, 2012:
 1.  Massachusetts Right to Repair Initiative
 2.  Massachusetts Death with Dignity Initiative
 3.  Massachusetts Medical Marijuana Initiative
 Massachusetts ballot measures, 2014:
 1.  Massachusetts Automatic Gas Tax Increase Repeal Initiative
 2.  Massachusetts Expansion of Bottle Deposits Initiative
 3.  Massachusetts Casino Repeal Initiative
 4.  Massachusetts Paid Sick Days Initiative
 Massachusetts ballot measures, 2016:
 1.  Massachusetts Expand Slot Machine Gaming Initiative
 2.  Massachusetts Charter School Expansion Initiative
 3.  Massachusetts Conditions for Farm Animals Initiative
 4.  Massachusetts Legalization, Regulation and Taxation of Marijuana Initiative
 Massachusetts ballot measures, 2018:
 1.  Nurse-Patient Assignment Limits
 2.  Advisory Commission for Amendments to the U.S. Constitution Regarding Corporate Personhood and Political Spending
 3.  Massachusetts Gender Identity Anti-Discrimination Initiative
 Massachusetts ballot measures, 2020:
 1.  Enhance, Update and Protect the 2013 Motor Vehicle Right to Repair Law Initiative
 2.  Implement Ranked-Choice Voting in Elections Initiative

Local

Boston mayoral elections
One-year terms (from 1822):
 1894 Boston mayoral election (Curtis) 
Two-year terms:
 1895 Boston mayoral election (Quincy) 
 1897 Boston mayoral election (Quincy) 
 1899 Boston mayoral election (Hart) 
 1901 Boston mayoral election (P. Collins) 
 1903 Boston mayoral election (P. Collins) 
 1905 Boston mayoral election (Fitzgerald) 
 1907 Boston mayoral election (Hibbard) 
Four-year terms, starting in 1910:
 1910 Boston mayoral election (Fitzgerald) 
 1914 Boston mayoral election (Curley) 
 1917 Boston mayoral election (Peters) 
 1921 Boston mayoral election (Curley) 
 1925 Boston mayoral election (Nichols) 
 1929 Boston mayoral election (Curley)
 1933 Boston mayoral election (Mansfield)
 1937 Boston mayoral election (Tobin)
 1941 Boston mayoral election (Tobin)
 1945 Boston mayoral election (Curley)
 1949 Boston mayoral election (Hynes)
 1951 Boston mayoral election (Hynes)
 1955 Boston mayoral election (Hynes)
 1959 Boston mayoral election (J. Collins)
 1963 Boston mayoral election (J. Collins)
 1967 Boston mayoral election (White)
 1971 Boston mayoral election (White)
 1975 Boston mayoral election (White)
 1979 Boston mayoral election (White)
 1983 Boston mayoral election (Flynn)
 1987 Boston mayoral election (Flynn)
 1991 Boston mayoral election (Flynn)
 1993 Boston mayoral election (Menino)
 1997 Boston mayoral election (Menino)
 2001 Boston mayoral election (Menino)
 2005 Boston mayoral election (Menino)
 2009 Boston mayoral election (Menino)
 2013 Boston mayoral election (Walsh)
 2017 Boston mayoral election (Walsh)
 2021 Boston mayoral election (Wu)

Boston City Council elections
 1983 Boston City Council election
 1985 Boston City Council election
 1987 Boston City Council election
 1989 Boston City Council election
 1991 Boston City Council election
 1993 Boston City Council election
 1995 Boston City Council election
 1997 Boston City Council election
 1999 Boston City Council election
 2001 Boston City Council election
 2003 Boston City Council election
 2005 Boston City Council election
 2007 Boston City Council election
 2009 Boston City Council election
 2011 Boston City Council election
 2013 Boston City Council election
 2015 Boston City Council election
 2017 Boston City Council election
 2019 Boston City Council election
 2021 Boston City Council election

Other
 2013 Cambridge, Massachusetts municipal election

United States president
 …
 1992 United States presidential election in Massachusetts (Clinton won both state and the election)
 1996 United States presidential election in Massachusetts (Clinton won both state and the election)
 2000 United States presidential election in Massachusetts (Gore won state; G. W. Bush won election)
 2004 United States presidential election in Massachusetts (Kerry won state; G. W. Bush won election)
 2008 United States presidential election in Massachusetts (Obama won both the state and the election)
 2012 United States presidential election in Massachusetts (Obama won both the state and the election)
 2016 United States presidential election in Massachusetts (Clinton won state; Trump won election)
 2020 United States presidential election in Massachusetts (Biden won both the state and the election)

United States Senate
(With winners)

United States House of Representatives 

 1788–1789 United States House of Representatives elections in Massachusetts
 1790–1792 United States House of Representatives elections in Massachusetts
 1792–1793 United States House of Representatives elections in Massachusetts
 1794–1795 United States House of Representatives elections in Massachusetts
 1796–1797 United States House of Representatives elections in Massachusetts
 1796 Massachusetts's 1st congressional district special election (Thomson J. Skinner)
 1796 Massachusetts's 10th congressional district special election (Samuel Sewall)
 1797 Massachusetts's 11th congressional district special election (Bailey Bartlett)
 1798–1799 United States House of Representatives elections in Massachusetts
 1800–1801 United States House of Representatives elections in Massachusetts
 1800 Massachusetts's 3rd congressional district special election (Ebenezer Mattoon)
 1800 Massachusetts's 4th congressional district special election (Levi Lincoln Sr.)
 1800 Massachusetts's 10th congressional district special election (Nathan Read)
 1801 Massachusetts's 4th congressional district special election (Seth Hastings)
 1801–1802 Massachusetts's 12th congressional district special election (Samuel Thatcher)
 1801 Massachusetts's 14th congressional district special election (Richard Cutts)
 1802–1803 United States House of Representatives elections in Massachusetts
 1804 United States House of Representatives elections in Massachusetts
 1804 Massachusetts's 12th congressional district special election (Simon Larned)
 1806 United States House of Representatives elections in Massachusetts
 1807 Massachusetts's 12th congressional district special election (Ezekiel Bacon)
 1808 United States House of Representatives elections in Massachusetts
 1808 Massachusetts's 2nd congressional district special election (Joseph Story)
 1810–1811 United States House of Representatives elections in Massachusetts
 1810 Massachusetts's 10th congressional district special election (Joseph Allen)
 1810 Massachusetts's 11th congressional district special election (Abijah Bigelow)
 1811 Massachusetts's 4th congressional district special election (William M. Richardson)
 1812–1813 United States House of Representatives elections in Massachusetts
 1812 Massachusetts's 17th congressional district special election (Francis Carr)
 1814–1815 United States House of Representatives elections in Massachusetts
 1814 Massachusetts's 4th congressional district special election (Samuel Dana)
 1814 Massachusetts's 12th congressional district special election (John W. Hulbert)
 1816–1817 United States House of Representatives elections in Massachusetts
 1816 Massachusetts's 11th congressional district special election (Benjamin Adams)
 1817 Massachusetts's 1st congressional district special election (Jonathan Mason)
 1818–1819 United States House of Representatives elections in Massachusetts
 1818 Massachusetts's 20th congressional district special election (Enoch Lincoln)
 1820–1821 United States House of Representatives elections in Massachusetts
 1820 Massachusetts's 1st congressional district special election (Benjamin Gorham)
 1820 Massachusetts's 8th congressional district special election (Aaron Hobart)
 1820 Massachusetts's 13th congressional district special election (William Eustis)
 1822–1823 United States House of Representatives elections in Massachusetts
 1824–1825 United States House of Representatives elections in Massachusetts
 1824 Massachusetts's 10th congressional district special election (John Bailey)
 1826–1827 United States House of Representatives elections in Massachusetts
 1827 Massachusetts's 1st congressional district special election (Benjamin Gorham)
 1828 United States House of Representatives elections in Massachusetts
 1830–1832 United States House of Representatives elections in Massachusetts
 1833–1834 United States House of Representatives elections in Massachusetts
 1834–1835 United States House of Representatives elections in Massachusetts
 1834 Massachusetts's 2nd congressional district special election (Stephen C. Phillips)
 1834 Massachusetts's 5th congressional district special election (Levi Lincoln Jr.)
 1836 United States House of Representatives elections in Massachusetts
 1838–1839 United States House of Representatives elections in Massachusetts
 1838 Massachusetts's 2nd congressional district special election (Leverett Saltonstall)
 1839
 1839 Massachusetts's 6th congressional district special election (Osmyn Baker)
 1840–1841 United States House of Representatives elections in Massachusetts
 1840 Massachusetts's 1st congressional district special election (Robert C. Winthrop)
 1841 Massachusetts's 5th congressional district special election (Charles Hudson)
 1842–1844 United States House of Representatives elections in Massachusetts
 June 1842 Massachusetts's 1st congressional district special election (Nathan Appleton)
 November 1842 Massachusetts's 1st congressional district special election (Robert C. Winthrop)
 1843 Massachusetts's 10th congressional district special election (Joseph Grinnell)
 1844–1846 United States House of Representatives elections in Massachusetts
 1846 United States House of Representatives elections in Massachusetts
 1848–1850 United States House of Representatives elections in Massachusetts
 1848 Massachusetts's 8th congressional district special election (Horace Mann)
 1850–1851 United States House of Representatives elections in Massachusetts
 1850 Massachusetts's 1st congressional district special election (Samuel A. Eliot)
 1852 United States House of Representatives elections in Massachusetts
 1852 Massachusetts's 2nd congressional district special election (Francis B. Fay)
 1852 Massachusetts's 3rd congressional district special election (Lorenzo Sabine)
 1852 Massachusetts's 9th congressional district special election (Edward P. Little)
 1854 United States House of Representatives elections in Massachusetts
 1854 Massachusetts's 1st congressional district special election (Thomas D. Eliot)
 1856 United States House of Representatives elections in Massachusetts
 1858 United States House of Representatives elections in Massachusetts
 1858 Massachusetts's 7th congressional district special election (Daniel W. Gooch)
 1860 United States House of Representatives elections in Massachusetts
 1861 Massachusetts's 5th congressional district special election (Samuel Hooper)
 1862 United States House of Representatives elections in Massachusetts
 1862 Massachusetts's 9th congressional district special election (Amasa Walker)
 1864 United States House of Representatives elections in Massachusetts
 1865 Massachusetts's 6th congressional district special election (Nathaniel P. Banks)
 1866 United States House of Representatives elections in Massachusetts
 1868 United States House of Representatives elections in Massachusetts
 1869 Massachusetts's 7th congressional district special election (George M. Brooks)
 1870 United States House of Representatives elections in Massachusetts
 1872 United States House of Representatives elections in Massachusetts
 1872 Massachusetts's 7th congressional district special election (Constantine C. Esty)
 1872 Massachusetts's 9th congressional district special election (Alvah Crocker)
 1873 Massachusetts's 3rd congressional district special election (Henry L. Pierce)
 1874 United States House of Representatives elections in Massachusetts
 1875 Massachusetts's 10th congressional district special election (Julius H. Seelye)
 1875 Massachusetts's 1st congressional district special election (William W. Crapo)
 1876 United States House of Representatives elections in Massachusetts
 1876 Massachusetts's 3rd congressional district special election (Josiah G. Abbott)
 1878 United States House of Representatives elections in Massachusetts
 1880 United States House of Representatives elections in Massachusetts
 1882 United States House of Representatives elections in Massachusetts
 1884 United States House of Representatives elections in Massachusetts
 1884 Massachusetts's 12th congressional district special election (Francis W. Rockwell)
 1886 United States House of Representatives elections in Massachusetts
 1888 United States House of Representatives elections in Massachusetts
 1890 United States House of Representatives elections in Massachusetts
 1892 United States House of Representatives elections in Massachusetts
 1893 Massachusetts's 7th congressional district special election (William Everett)
 1894 United States House of Representatives elections in Massachusetts
 1895 Massachusetts's 6th congressional district special election (William H. Moody)
 1896 United States House of Representatives elections in Massachusetts
 1897 Massachusetts's 1st congressional district special election (George P. Lawrence)
 1898 United States House of Representatives elections in Massachusetts
 1898 Massachusetts's 13th congressional district special election (William S. Greene)
 1900 United States House of Representatives elections in Massachusetts
 1902 United States House of Representatives elections in Massachusetts
 1902 Massachusetts's 6th congressional district special election (Augustus P. Gardner)
 1904 United States House of Representatives elections in Massachusetts
 1906 United States House of Representatives elections in Massachusetts
 1906 Massachusetts's 3rd congressional district special election (Charles G. Washburn)
 1908 United States House of Representatives elections in Massachusetts
 1910 United States House of Representatives elections in Massachusetts
 1910 Massachusetts's 3rd congressional district special election (John J. Mitchell)
 1910 Massachusetts's 14th congressional district special election (Eugene Foss)
 1912 United States House of Representatives elections in Massachusetts
 1913 Massachusetts's 3rd congressional district special election (Calvin Paige)
 1913 Massachusetts's 13th congressional district special election (John J. Mitchell)
 1914 United States House of Representatives elections in Massachusetts
 1914 Massachusetts's 12th congressional district special election (James A. Gallivan)
 1916 United States House of Representatives elections in Massachusetts
 1917 Massachusetts's 6th congressional district special election (Willfred W. Lufkin)
 1918 United States House of Representatives elections in Massachusetts
 1920 United States House of Representatives elections in Massachusetts
 1921 Massachusetts's 6th congressional district special election (Abram Andrew)
 1922 United States House of Representatives elections in Massachusetts
 1922 Massachusetts's 16th congressional district special election (Charles L. Gifford)
 1924 United States House of Representatives elections in Massachusetts
 1924 Massachusetts's 15th congressional district special election (Robert M. Leach)
 1925 Massachusetts's 2nd congressional district special election (Henry L. Bowles)
 1925 Massachusetts's 5th congressional district special election (Edith Nourse Rogers)
 1926 United States House of Representatives elections in Massachusetts
 1926 Massachusetts's 8th congressional district special election (Frederick W. Dallinger)
 1928 United States House of Representatives elections in Massachusetts
 1928 Massachusetts's 12th congressional district special election (John W. McCormack)
 1928 Massachusetts's 14th congressional district special election (Richard Wigglesworth)
 1930 United States House of Representatives elections in Massachusetts
 1930 Massachusetts's 2nd congressional district special election (William J. Granfield)
 1932 United States House of Representatives elections in Massachusetts
 1934 United States House of Representatives elections in Massachusetts
 1936 United States House of Representatives elections in Massachusetts
 1937 Massachusetts's 7th congressional district special election (Lawrence J. Connery)
 1937 Massachusetts's 11th congressional district special election (Thomas A. Flaherty)
 1938 United States House of Representatives elections in Massachusetts
 1940 United States House of Representatives elections in Massachusetts
 1941 Massachusetts's 7th congressional district special election (Thomas J. Lane)
 1942 United States House of Representatives elections in Massachusetts
 1944 United States House of Representatives elections in Massachusetts
 1946 United States House of Representatives elections in Massachusetts
 1947 Massachusetts's 9th congressional district special election (Donald W. Nicholson)
 1948 United States House of Representatives elections in Massachusetts
 1950 United States House of Representatives elections in Massachusetts
 1950 Massachusetts's 6th congressional district special election (William H. Bates)
 1952 United States House of Representatives elections in Massachusetts
 1954 United States House of Representatives elections in Massachusetts
 1956 United States House of Representatives elections in Massachusetts
 1958 United States House of Representatives elections in Massachusetts
 1960 United States House of Representatives elections in Massachusetts
 1962 United States House of Representatives elections in Massachusetts
 1964 United States House of Representatives elections in Massachusetts
 1966 United States House of Representatives elections in Massachusetts
 1968 United States House of Representatives elections in Massachusetts
 1969 Massachusetts's 6th congressional district special election (Michael J. Harrington)
 1970 United States House of Representatives elections in Massachusetts
 1972 United States House of Representatives elections in Massachusetts
 1974 United States House of Representatives elections in Massachusetts
 1976 United States House of Representatives elections in Massachusetts
 1976 Massachusetts's 7th congressional district special election (Ed Markey)
 1978 United States House of Representatives elections in Massachusetts
 1980 United States House of Representatives elections in Massachusetts
 1982 United States House of Representatives elections in Massachusetts
 1984 United States House of Representatives elections in Massachusetts
 1986 United States House of Representatives elections in Massachusetts
 1988 United States House of Representatives elections in Massachusetts
 1990 United States House of Representatives elections in Massachusetts
 1991 Massachusetts's 1st congressional district special election (John Olver)
 1992 United States House of Representatives elections in Massachusetts
 1994 United States House of Representatives elections in Massachusetts
 1996 United States House of Representatives elections in Massachusetts
 1998 United States House of Representatives elections in Massachusetts
 2000 United States House of Representatives elections in Massachusetts
 2001 Massachusetts's 9th congressional district special election (Stephen Lynch)
 2002 United States House of Representatives elections in Massachusetts
 2004 United States House of Representatives elections in Massachusetts
 2006 United States House of Representatives elections in Massachusetts
 2007 Massachusetts's 5th congressional district special election (Nikki Tsongas)
 2008 United States House of Representatives elections in Massachusetts
 2010 United States House of Representatives elections in Massachusetts
 2012 United States House of Representatives elections in Massachusetts
 2013 Massachusetts's 5th congressional district special election (Katherine Clark)
 2014 United States House of Representatives elections in Massachusetts
 2016 United States House of Representatives elections in Massachusetts
 2018 United States House of Representatives elections in Massachusetts
 2020 United States House of Representatives elections in Massachusetts
 2022 United States House of Representatives elections in Massachusetts

By year

1780s - 1790s

1800s

1810s

1820s

1830s

1840s

1850s

1860s

1870s

1880s

1890s

1900s

1910s

1920s

1930s

1940s

1950s

1960s

1970s

1980s

1990s

2000s

2010s

2020s

See also 
Political party strength in Massachusetts
United States presidential elections in Massachusetts

References

External links 

Elections Division at the Massachusetts Secretary of State official site

 Digital Public Library of America. Assorted materials related to Massachusetts elections
 
 
  (State affiliate of the U.S. League of Women Voters)
 

 
Elections List
Political events in Massachusetts
massachusetts